Wind power is a fledgling source of renewable energy in Serbia. In 2020, the wind power provided 963 GWh (2.83%) of the total electricity generated in Serbia, up from 48 GWh (0.15%) in 2017.

Plants
The first wind farm was opened in 2011 and is located in Leskova, Tutin; it has installed capacity of 600 KW. In 2015, wind farm near Kula was opened and has installed capacity of 9.9 MW; it was constructed by MK Fintel Wind. La Pikolina (6.6 MW) wind farm near Vršac was opened in 2016.

Malibunar (8 MW) went online in 2017. Alibunar (42 MW) went online in 2018.

In 2019 three wind farms went online: Košava near Vršac (69 MW), Čibuk 1 near Kovin (158 MW) and Kovačica (104 MW).

See also
 Renewable energy commercialization
 Renewable energy in the European Union
 Renewable energy in Serbia
 Renewable energy by country

References